"My Humps" is a hip hop and dance song recorded by American group The Black Eyed Peas for their fourth studio album Monkey Business (2005). It is written and produced by group member will.i.am and structured as a duet between will.i.am and Fergie. The song sparked controversy because of its title and lyrics, which center on Fergie using her breasts and buttocks to accomplish her goals. It was released as the third single from Monkey Business on September 20, 2005 by A&M Records and Interscope Records.

Music critics responded negatively to "My Humps", deeming it a repetitive and puerile form of sexual titillation. The song garnered comparisons to Kelis' 2003 hit single "Milkshake", a song that presents similar sexual themes and uses milk as a metaphor. Despite the negative critical response, the song won Best Pop Performance by a Duo or Group with Vocals at the 49th Annual Grammy Awards (2007). A commercial success, it became the Black Eyed Peas' second single to reach the top three on the US Billboard Hot 100 by peaking at number three, and one of their best-selling singles, selling over two million digital downloads. The accompanying music video for "My Humps" was directed by Fatima Robinson and Malik Hassan Sayeed and won an MTV Video Music Award for Best Hip-Hop Video. The song has been covered and parodied by several entertainers, including Alanis Morissette and Jack Heath.

Background
According to will.i.am, he had originally written the song for the American recording group the Pussycat Dolls, but decided to have them use "Beep" instead, a song that was later released as the third single from their debut studio album PCD (2005). In addition to writing and producing "My Humps", will.i.am also engineered the track with Jason "ill-aroma" Villaroman and performed on all the instruments present on the track. will.i.am and group member Fergie are the main vocalists on the song, while the other two members, Taboo and apl.de.ap, provide background vocals. "My Humps" was recorded at two locations in California: The Stewchia in Los Feliz and Morning View Studios in Malibu. The song was finally mixed by Romanian mix engineer Șerban Ghenea. The song samples lines from Sexual Harassment's 1983 single, "I Need a Freak", which in turn quote Antonín Dvořák's New World Symphony. In June 2011, American disc jockey Lynn Tolliver, the writer of "I Need a Freak," won a lawsuit that claimed publisher and producer James McCant committed copyright infringement and licensed the song to the group without his permission. Tolliver said the song was licensed under his name and that in 1983 McCant had agreed to pay him 75 percent of any royalties from the song. Tolliver won $1.2 million as a result. The song was back in court in 2014 over royalty issues.

"My Humps" was released as the third single from Monkey Business (2005), after "Don't Phunk with My Heart" and "Don't Lie". After gaining considerable airplay and strong digital downloads, Interscope Records decided to release it while "Don't Lie" was still rising up the charts. It was released as the album's third single in the United States on September 20, 2005. On November 4, 2005, a remix of the song by American rapper Lil Jon was released to digital retailers through Interscope Records. Interscope also released the single internationally on November 7, 2005, featuring the Lil Jon remix as a B-side. On November 11, 2005, an extended play was released internationally. It features the song "So Real" and the Lil Jon remix. On November 18, 2005, the song was released internationally as a CD single and maxi single.

Composition
"My Humps" is a hip hop and dance track that is backed by an electro-influenced drum beat. It incorporates a compositional sample of "I Need a Freak", written by Lynn Tolliver (a.k.a. David Payton). Talia Kraines of BBC Music commented that Fergie and will.i.am "sing playfully at each other, easily creating a vision of a boy/girl break-danceoff." Kraines also noted that the song sounded like a mix between Paula Abdul's "Opposites Attract" (Forever Your Girl, 1988) and Neneh Cherry's "Buffalo Stance" (Raw Like Sushi, 1989). Steve "Flash" Juon of RapReviews said that Fergie's rap verse was "Khia-esque". Azeem Ahmad of musicOMH noted that the song sounded similar to Gwen Stefani's "Hollaback Girl" (Love. Angel. Music. Baby., 2004).

Music video
The official music video for "My Humps", directed by Fatima Robinson and Malik Hassan Sayeed, premiered on TRL. It shows Fergie dancing with backup dancers as images of expensive items such as Louis Vuitton purses and jewelry, which is supposed to be the jewelry her men have bought her, appear on the screen. The other members of Black Eyed Peas—apl.de.ap, Taboo, and will.i.am—sing about how much they spend on Fergie as she sings about her feminine attributes.

The video received the award for "Best Hip-Hop Video" at the 2006 MTV Video Music Awards on August 31, 2006.

Critical reception
Talia Kraines of BBC Music commended "My Humps" as the most immediate track on the album, while noting that it could sound perfect on a Gwen Stefani album. Steve "Flash" Juon of RapReviews expressed a different feeling towards the song, calling Fergie's rap a "poor man's version of "My Neck, My Back" and will.i.am.'s verses "retarded". Azeem Ahmad of musicOMH, in his review of Monkey Business, expressed mixed feelings toward "My Humps", writing that it is "uneasy but it does seem to fit Fergie's persona while will.i.am's vocals suit him down to the ground." In the review the single on the same publication, Mark Fielding dismissed the sexual and materialistic lyrics, expressing high discontent for rhyming drunk with hump(s), lump(s), and bump(s). Despite this, Fielding pointed out the mentions of "coco pops" and "milk", calling them ludicrous yet laughable, but praised the song's production.

Kelefa Sanneh of The New York Times commented that the single is going "most likely to live in infamy." Bill Lamb of About.com gave the song a two and a half star rating, giving credit to its catchy appeal, but was ultimately dismissed for its "junior high level sexual titillation", "boring minimalist repetition", and "serious lack of true wit and humor." Lamb's review was notably influenced by the success of the previous album, Elephunk (2003), indicated by this comment "In light of the band's previous triumphs as an inventive, socially conscious hip hop group, Black Eyed Peas releasing a song that trades on obsessions with female breasts simply to have a hit song is rather depressing." He also compared the song to Ciara's "Goodies" and Kelis's "Milkshake", commending the aforementioned single for presenting "greater wit and self awareness" than "My Humps". Jason King of The Village Voice called "My Humps" "asinine" and commented, "[it] conjures up none of the erotic discomfiture that gave "Milkshake" and "Cameltoe" their bite." Rolling Stone called it "an irresistible, butt-stupid ode to Fergie's ass."

Derision and accolades
"My Humps" is regarded by multiple critics as the single worst song ever written. Rolling Stone readers voted the track number one in the "20 Most Annoying Songs" list. Ryan Schreiber of Pitchfork Media listed "My Humps" at number three on "The 15 Worst Releases of 2005" list, writing "Like 'Who Let the Dogs Out' before it, 'My Humps' is so monumentally vacuous, slapped together and tossed-off that it truly tests the definition of 'song';" and described it as a "five-minute commercial jingle." In his 2009 book Crap Lyrics, music journalist Johnny Sharp lists "My Humps" as "the worst song lyrics in the world", describing them as "objectification of the female form to sewer-like depths".

Chart performance
"My Humps" proved to be the most commercially successful single from Monkey Business (2005). Before its release as a single, "My Humps" was already charting while the previous single "Don't Lie" was still gaining traction. The song entered the Billboard Hot 100 on August 20, 2005, at number eighty-five and moved up to number fifty-nine in the following week, making the second largest leap on the chart for that week. It continue rising up the chart, and by the time the song was officially released as a single, it entered the top ten. On November 5, 2005, "My Humps" reached number three on the Hot 100, where it lasted for six weeks. It lasted more than nine months on the Billboard Hot 100, sixteen weeks of which were spent inside the top ten. Since the single's release, the song has sold 2,203,000 downloads and has earned a double platinum certification by the Recording Industry Association of America (RIAA) for mastertone sales.

"My Humps" was commercially successful in the Australasia territories. On November 21, 2005, the song debuted and peaked at number one on the Australian Singles Chart. It lasted two weeks at the top position and a total of seventeen weeks on the chart. The song shipped 70,000 copies in Australia, earning a platinum certification by Australian Recording Industry Association (ARIA). This success was replicated in New Zealand, when it debuted on the New Zealand Top 40 at number one on November 28, 2005. It fell off the top position in the following week and reappeared at number one six weeks later.

"My Humps" proved to be a success in Europe, peaking inside the top ten in eleven countries and in the top twenty in two others, while also peaking at number two on the European Hot 100. The song experienced its greatest performance in the British Isles. In the United Kingdom, the song debuted and peaked at number three, becoming the week's "highest debut".  It stalled at the position the next week until falling to number five in the following week. "My Humps" eventually sold 295,000 copies in the country, according to The Official Charts Company. The song entered the Irish Singles Chart at number three on November 17, 2005.  It stalled for two more weeks at that position until rising to number one in the following week. The song spent a total of nineteen weeks on the chart.

Covers
"My Humps" has been covered and parodied by several amateur and established acts. Australian novelist Jack Heath cited the song and its "objectification of women disguised as empowerment" as his primary inspiration for his 2005 style parody "Don't Stall". Electronic musician Peaches covered the song in 2006, altering the lyrics humorously and changing the title to "My Dumps". Canadian rock singer Alanis Morissette covered the song in 2007, seemingly as an April Fools' Day prank. In contrast to the original "My Humps", Morissette's cover is performed slowly and in the style of a ballad, with only a piano accompanying the vocal. On April 2, a video in which Morissette parodies Fergie's dancing moves in the original "My Humps" music video was added to the website YouTube. By April 3, the video was the most viewed on Technorati, and it was viewed 1.5 million times six days later. The video has been hosted on Morissette's official website. TIME stated that the parody proved that Morissette understands irony, in reference to her hit single, "Ironic". On April 15, Fergie confirmed to E! News that she thought that the parody was hilarious and genius. Fergie sent Alanis a cake in the shape of buttocks.

Greeting card company American Greetings parodied the song in their Christmas e-card, "Three Wise Camels", in which the camels of the Three Wise Men rap about the gifts awaiting baby Jesus, which are sitting on their humps. American rapper Afroman parodied the song for his album Waiting to Inhale entitled "My Chunk". His lyrics have opposite meaning: he raps about his genitals and receiving money from women because he's a pimp. Sketch-comedy show MADtv did a parody titled "My Slump" about George W. Bush. New Zealander comedy duo Flight of the Conchords did a parody of the song entitled "Sugarlumps" in the second-season episode "The New Cup".

Track listings

Two-track CD single
 "My Humps" – 4:10
 "My Humps" (Lil Jon remix) – 3:45

International EP
 "My Humps" (single version) – 4:10
 "My Humps" (Lil Jon remix) – 3:44
 "So Real" (non-LP version) – 2:25

Maxi single
 "My Humps" (single version) – 4:13
 "My Humps" (Lil Jon remix) – 3:46
 "So Real" (non-LP version) – 2:25
 "My Humps" (video)

Lil Jon remix
 "My Humps" (Lil Jon remix) – 3:44

Credits and personnel
Recording
 Recorded at the Stewchia in Los Feliz, California and Morning View Studios in Malibu, California.
 Contains elements of "I Need a Freak", written by David Payton (the pseudonym of Lynn Tolliver) under Sugar Hill Music Publishing (BMI).

Personnel
 Songwriting – William Adams, David Payton
 Production – will.i.am
 Engineering – will.i.am, Jason "ill-aroma" Villaroman
 Mixing – Serban Ghenea
 Vocals – Fergie, will.i.am
 Programming, synthesizers, bass guitar – will.i.am

Charts

Weekly charts

Year-end charts

Decade-end charts

Certifications

Release history

References

2005 singles
Black Eyed Peas songs
Alanis Morissette songs
Peaches (musician) songs
Songs written by will.i.am
Interscope Records singles
A&M Records singles
Number-one singles in Australia
Irish Singles Chart number-one singles
Number-one singles in New Zealand
Dirty rap songs
Music videos directed by Fatima Robinson
Sampling controversies
Songs involved in plagiarism controversies
2005 songs